Phaeochlaena gyon is a moth of the family Notodontidae first described by Johan Christian Fabricius in 1787. It is endemic to the Guyana Shield and points west, at least as far as the Upper Amazon basin of Colombia and Ecuador.

References

Moths described in 1787
Notodontidae of South America